Holter is a surname. Notable people with the surname include:

Anton Holter (1831-1921), Norwegian-born American pioneer and entrepreneur
Bjørn Holter (born 1981), Norwegian singer-songwriter
Christian Holter (born 1972), Norwegian footballer
Don Wendell Holter (1905–1999), American United Methodist bishop
Dwayn Holter (born 1995), Luxembourgian footballer
Harriet Holter (1922–1997), Norwegian social psychologist
Hermann Hölter (1900–1989), German Olympic pentathlete, and Generalleutnant during World War II
Helmut Holter (born 1953), German politician of the party The Left
Ike Holter (born 1985), American playwright
Iver Holter (1850–1941), Norwegian composer, conductor and music director of the Oslo Philharmonic
John Holter (1916–2003), American inventor
Julia Holter (born 1984), American musician
Norman Holter (1914–1983), American biophysicist
Oscar Holter, Swedish and American record producer and songwriter
Øystein Gullvåg Holter (born 1952), Norwegian sociologist
Reidar Holter (1892–1953), Norwegian Olympic rower
Sigurd Holter (1886–1963), Norwegian Olympic sailor
Lisbeth F.K. Holter Brudal (born 1935), Norwegian psychologist
Bjørn Atle Holter-Hovind (born 1944), Norwegian media and corporate executive